Paul Martin (14 April 1964 - 30 March 2019) was an Australian rules footballer who played with South Adelaide in the South Australian National Football League (SANFL).  He won the David Kantilla Memorial Trophy (Best First Year Player) in 1982, and the following year was selected in the Advertiser Team of the Year.

Notes

External links 
Paul Martin's profile at AustralianFootball.com

1964 births
2019 deaths
South Adelaide Football Club players
Australian rules footballers from South Australia
Christies Beach Football Club players